BATUS may refer to:

 BATUS Inc., subsidiary of British American Tobacco
 British Army Training Unit Suffield
 Batus (beetle), a genus of beetles